Moondru Per Moondru Kadal is a 2013 Indian Tamil-language romance film co-edited, co-written and directed by Vasanth. It stars Arjun, Cheran, Vimal, Surveen Chawla, Muktha Bhanu and Lasini. The film features music composed by Yuvan Shankar Raja. Cinematography and editing were handled by Bhojan K. Dinesh and S. N. Fazil respectively. The film was released on 1 May 2013.

Plot 
Varun (Vimal) and Anjana’s (Lasini) love story happens in the Ooty mountains (in Tamil literature, they are referred to as Kurinji); Gunasekar (Cheran) and Mallika’s (Muktha Bhanu) story happens in Tuticorin seashore (Neidhal); and Paul Harris Rosario (Arjun Sarja) and Divya’s (Surveen Chawla) story happens in the city (Marudham). The story revolves around these couples and the trials and tribulations they face.

Varun explains the story of his life where he had fallen with Anjana in spite of knowing that her engagement has been called off, but he later sacrifices his love after hearing Guna and Mallika's story.

Guna is a philanthropist who runs an organisation called "Punnagai," a rehabilitation center for jail prisoners. Mallika, a physiotherapist, silently pines love for him. When Guna failed to unite a prisoner (Aadukalam Naren) with his family, Mallika does the job. Impressed with her, he handles the responsibility of taking care of Punnagai to her and leaves the town.

Another story is of Harris, a swimming coach, and his student-cum-lover Divya (Varun claims Divya is his childhood friend, but there is no scene where they are together). Divya is disappointed for losing the swimming match, and her father Thiruvengadam (Thambi Ramaiah) advises another coach named Elango (John Vijay) to replace Harris with another coach, but Divya is adamant that Harris should be her coach. Meanwhile, Harris gets involved in a bike accident where his legs and hands have been hurt, but he encourages Divya to take part in the Olympics swimming match. Divya practices for the match rigorously and wins the competition by finishing it in less than 56 seconds.

In 2016, Varun narrated these stories because they prompted him to write a novel called "Moondru Kaadhal". Harris arrives at the press conference of the book release and says that he is alive because of Divya. She is the epitome of goodness and confidence, and he narrates that though she had won the match, she died due to heart attack on the swimming pool. The film ends with Harris uttering Kaadhal Ketpadhalla Koduppadhu ("Love is not to be asked but to be given").

Cast 

 Arjun as Paul Harris Rosario aka Paul
 Cheran as Gunasekar
 Vimal as Varun
 Surveen Chawla as Divya
 Muktha Bhanu as Mallika
 Lasini as Anjana, Varun's love interest
 Thambi Ramaiah as Thiruvengadam (Divya's father)
 Shanthi Williams as Guna's mother
 Ravi Raghavendra as Varun's father
 John Vijay as Elango
 Aadukalam Naren as Prisoner
 Bosskey as Interviewer
 Boys Rajan as Doctor
 Sathyan
 Appukutty
 Ritvik Varun in a special appearance
 Robert in a special appearance
 Blaaze in a special appearance

Production

Development 
In July 2011, reports confirmed that Vasanth would start directing his next film, titled as Moondru Per Moondru Kaadhal, four years after his last film Satham Podathey was released. Vasanth reportedly had been waiting with the script for three years to "get the right actors". He further noted that the film was not a love story but a "story about love". The film would consist of three love stories featuring the three lead characters, which play out in three landscapes: by the seaside, in the mountains and on the plains. Bharath Kumar, a fan of Vasanth's films, came forward to produce the film along with his friends under his newly launched Mahendra Talkies banner. Moondru Per Moondru Kaadhal was started on 9 August 2011.

Casting 
The director had hired Arjun, who had worked with Vasanth in Rhythm (2000) before, and director-turned-actor Cheran for the lead roles, while stating that four newcomers would be selected for another male lead and the three lead female roles. By November 2011, sources suggested that Shiva might be chosen for the third lead role, but the actor denied being approached by the team, while later the month it was speculated that Vasanth would introduce his son to play the role. In January 2011 eventually, Vasanth confirmed that Vimal had been finalized. Muktha Bhanu, formerly credited as Bhanu, was chosen to portray one of the female leads, while Shruti Iyer, a Kingfisher Calendar Model Hunt model from Mumbai and participant of I AM She 2010 beauty pageant, and Punjabi actress Surveen Chawla agreed to play the other two lead roles, making their Tamil film debuts. Shruti Iyer was rechristened and credited as Lasini in the film. Furthermore, National Film Award winning actors Thambi Ramaiah and Appukutty were selected for supporting roles, providing comic relief. 
Despite knowing Tamil, Lasini, a native of Palakkad, had to train to improve her Tamil accent. Chawla, despite already knowing how to swim, did additional training to prepare for her role and Muktha Banu had to speak in Nagercoil slang for her scenes.

Filming 
Shooting for the film began by late 2011 in Kerala, and was continued in Nagercoil in November and December 2012. In July 2012, the crew moved to the hill station of Ooty to film major portions. Another schedule was later held in Hyderabad.

Music 

Vasanth hired Yuvan Shankar Raja as the composer, with whom he had previously worked in Poovellam Kettuppar (1999) and his last project Satham Podathey (2007). In an interview, the director stated that Yuvan Shankar Raja had put in about seven months of work for this film, while describing the genre of the soundtrack as post-modern music. The soundtrack album features six songs with lyrics penned by Na. Muthukumar.

Composing was started even before the film was launched, with the first song being recorded on 9 August 2011. Popular Bollywood singer Sonu Nigam originally sang the melody titled "Mazhai Mazhai Mazhaiyo Mazhai", which was recorded in Mumbai. The final version, however, featured Karthik's vocals. Neha Bhasin, who had sung the well received song "Pesugiren" in Satham Podathey before, lent her voice for another song in the album. Nandini Srikar of Ra.One fame crooned a solo "Aaha Kadhal", which, too, was recorded in Mumbai, while composer Ramesh Vinayagam sang a peppy number titled "Stop the Paatu" for the album. A teaser trailer of "Stop The Paatu" was released online in September 2012 and garnered positive response. The composer himself performed the song "Unakkagave" which was dubbed as the first dubstep track in Tamil cinema. Yuvan Shankar Raja later revealed that he had not composed a single new tune for the film, but that all were stock songs he had earlier recorded which were chosen by Vasanth. The final mixing was done by Kausikan Sivalingam in Berlin, according to Vasanth.

The album was launched in a critically acclaimed event on 25 January 2013 at the Park Sheraton Hotel in Chennai. The entire cast and crew of the film, besides noted film personalities, including directors K. Balachander, K. S. Ravikumar, K. Bhagyaraj, N. Lingusamy, Sasi and actors Shanthanu Bhagyaraj, Khushbu, Krishna, Prakash Raj were present at the function which was host by television anchors Ma Ka Pa Anand and Divyadarshini. The songs from the album were also performed live on stage by the original artists.

Release 
Moondru Per Moondru Kadhal was released on 1 May 2013 alongside Ethir Neechal and Soodhu Kavvum.

Reception 
The film received mixed reviews from critics. S Saraswathi from Rediff gave 2.5 stars out of 5 and wrote "Moondru Per Moondru Kadhal lacks the intensity expected of a Vasanth film, but makes up for it with its exceptional music. Sify said "MPMK is technically chic and Vasanth has made an interesting film which has its shares of romantic break-up`s and heart breaks" and rated the film as average. Behindwoods gave 2 stars out of 5 and stated "Vasanth’s Moondru Per Moondru Kadhal, although eulogizes love, works in parts with music and camera helping the story but his style has not been felt powerfully in the film. Indiaglitz wrote "To sum up, the director's usual foray is missing and might work in bits with the help of some breezy music, help from the cast and some good cinematography". in.com rated the film 2.5 out of 5 and wrote "MPMK is not entirely bad and those who love pure romantic flicks can watch it once provided if you can sit through the bland first hour of the film." Baradwaj Rangan of the Hindu wrote "But the film isn’t worked out very well. It doesn’t build the way it ought to, and the various strands don’t come together satisfactorily — they hang loose."

References

External links 
 

2013 romantic drama films
2013 films
Films shot in Ooty
Films scored by Yuvan Shankar Raja
Films directed by Vasanth
2010s Tamil-language films
Hyperlink films
Indian romantic drama films